These are the Canadian number-one albums of 2017. The chart is compiled by Nielsen SoundScan and published in Billboard magazine as Top Canadian Albums.

Note that Billboard publishes charts with an issue date approximately 10–11 days in advance.

Number-one albums

See also 
List of Canadian Hot 100 number-one singles of 2017
List of number-one digital songs of 2017 (Canada)

References

External links 
 Top 100 albums in Canada on Jam
 Billboard Top Canadian Albums

2017
Canada Albums
2017 in Canadian music